PGC 44691 is a spiral galaxy located about 350 million light-years away in the constellation Coma Berenices. It belongs to a galaxy cluster known as the Coma Cluster. In 1994, the Hubble Space Telescope observed PGC 44691 and the nearby elliptical galaxy NGC 4881 to infer the distance to the Coma Cluster.

See also 
 NGC 4921 Another spiral galaxy in the Coma Cluster

References

External links 

Spiral galaxies
Coma Berenices
44691
Coma Cluster